Finland was represented by Marion Rung, with the song "Tipi-tii", at the 1962 Eurovision Song Contest, which took place on 18 March in Luxembourg City. "Tipi-tii" was chosen as the Finnish entry at the national final organised by broadcaster Yle and held on 15 February. Rung would represent Finland again in the 1973 contest, also held in Luxembourg.

Before Eurovision

National final
The final was held at the Yle studios in Helsinki, hosted by Aarno Walli. Four songs took part, having qualified from a radio-only semi-final. Each song was performed twice by different singers and the winner was chosen by voting from ten regional juries.

At Eurovision 
On the night of the final Rung performed first in the running order, preceding Belgium. Voting was by each national jury awarding 3-2-1 to their top three songs, and at the close "Tipi-tii" had received 4 points (3 from the United Kingdom and 1 from Norway), placing Finland joint 7th (with Sweden) of the 16 entries. The Finnish jury reciprocated the British liking for their song by awarding their 3 points to the United Kingdom.

Voting

References 

1962
Countries in the Eurovision Song Contest 1962
Eurovision